Ibán Iyanga Travieso (born 2 June 1987), better known as Randy, is a Spanish-born Equatorial Guinean footballer. He has been a member of the Equatorial Guinea national team. Mainly a left winger, he can also operate as a right back.

Club career
Born in Las Palmas, Canary Islands, Spain to an Equatoguinean father and a Spanish mother, Randy made his professional debuts with local UD Las Palmas, playing once for the first team in the 2008–09 season as they competed in the second division. He spent the vast majority of his spell mainly associated to the reserve side.

In the following summer, Randy served a loan at CD Mirandés in the third level. In 2013, after only nine league appearances in two seasons combined and one year with amateurs CA Ceuta, he signed for Moroccan club Moghreb Tétouan; however, shortly after, he asked for the termination of his three-year contract due to personal reasons, and moved to Fokikos A.C. from the Football League (Greece).

On 20 August 2019, Randy joined Olympiacos Volou 1937 FC.

International career
In July 2010, Randy received his first call for the Equatoguinean national team, for a friendly match against Morocco on 11 August. However, he rejected the call to concentrate on club duties with Las Palmas.

Randy's debut came on 12 October 2010, in a 0–2 friendly loss with Botswana in Malabo.

Career statistics

Club

International goals
 (Equatorial Guinea score listed first, score column indicates score after each Randy goal)

References

External links

1987 births
Living people
Citizens of Equatorial Guinea through descent
Equatoguinean footballers
Association football fullbacks
Association football wingers
Association football utility players
Moghreb Tétouan players
Football League (Greece) players
Fokikos A.C. players
Iraklis Psachna F.C. players
OFI Crete F.C. players
A.E. Sparta P.A.E. players
Trikala F.C. players
Olympiacos Volos F.C. players
Cypriot First Division players
Aris Limassol FC players
Futuro Kings FC players
Equatorial Guinea international footballers
2012 Africa Cup of Nations players
2015 Africa Cup of Nations players
Equatoguinean sportspeople of Spanish descent
Equatoguinean expatriate footballers
Equatoguinean expatriate sportspeople in Greece
Expatriate footballers in Greece
Equatoguinean expatriate sportspeople in Cyprus
Expatriate footballers in Cyprus
Footballers from Las Palmas
Spanish footballers
Segunda División players
UD Las Palmas players
Segunda División B players
UD Las Palmas Atlético players
CD Mirandés footballers
Tercera División players
Spanish sportspeople of Equatoguinean descent
Spanish expatriate footballers
Spanish expatriate sportspeople in Greece
Spanish expatriate sportspeople in Cyprus
AD Ceuta FC players